William Prior may refer to:

 William Wain Prior (1876–1946), Danish general
 William Prior (priest) (1883–1969), Anglican priest
 William Matthew Prior (1806–1873), American folk artist
 W. H. Prior (1812–1882), British painter and engraver
 Billy Prior, a fictional character in Pat Barker's Regeneration Trilogy of novels

See also
William Pryor (disambiguation)